The Modified Modular Jack (MMJ) is a small form-factor serial port connector developed by Digital Equipment Corporation (DEC). It uses a modified version of the 6P6C modular connector with the latch displaced off-center so standard modular connectors found on Ethernet cables or phone jacks cannot accidentally be plugged in. MMJ connections are used on Digital minicomputers, such as the PDP-11, VAX and Alpha systems, and to connect terminals, printers, and serial console servers.

The MMJ connector has six conductors, using a superset of the RS-423 serial communication standard. The six pins are Tx and Rx for the data transmission, their return paths, and DSR and DTR for handshaking. The transmit and receive signals are differential, i.e. each signal is the voltage difference between the line and its associated ground, as opposed to a voltage on a single connector relative to a common reference. The system can also emulate RS-232 signaling by combining the lower voltage sides of each signal to the RS-232 signal ground line.

When connecting two DTE devices such as a computer and a printer, the Digital BC16E crossover cable is used.

Thrustmaster is using the MMJ connector for connecting its line of rudder pedals and racing pedals to either USB via a proprietary Thrustmaster Adapter, or directly to a joystick or racing wheel.

The Lego Mindstorms sets, beginning with the NXT, used similar plugs for motors and sensors to prevent the connection of standard telephone cords.

CEA-909 uses the MMJ connector for control signals to a smart antenna, which can either physically or electrically rotate for maximum signal strength.

See also
 Serial console

References

External links 
Wiring schemes for Modified Modular Jack cables and converters

Networking hardware